Kshatriya (from Sanskrit kṣatra, "rule, authority") is one of the four varna (social orders) of Hindu society, associated with warrior aristocracy. The Sanskrit term kṣatriyaḥ is used in the context of later Vedic society wherein members were organised into four classes: brahmin, kshatriya, vaishya and shudra.

History

Early Rigvedic tribal monarchy
The administrative machinery in the Vedic India was headed by a tribal king called Rajan whose position may or may not have been hereditary. The king may have been elected in a tribal assembly (called Samiti), which included women. The Rajan protected the tribe and cattle; was assisted by a priest; and did not maintain a standing army, though in the later period the rulership appears to have risen as a social class. The concept of the fourfold varna system is not yet recorded.

Later Vedic period
The hymn Purusha Sukta to the Rigveda describes the symbolic creation of the four varna-s through cosmic sacrifice (yajña). Some scholars consider the Purusha Sukta to be a late interpolation into the Rigveda based on the neological character of the composition, as compared to the more archaic style of the Vedic literature. Since not all Indians were fully regulated under the varna in the Vedic society, the Purusha Sukta was supposedly composed in order to secure Vedic sanction for the heredity caste scheme. An alternate explanation is that the word 'Shudra' does not occur anywhere else in the Rig-veda except the Purusha Sukta, leading some scholars to believe the Purusha Sukta was a composition of the later Rig-vedic period itself to denote, legitimize and sanctify an oppressive and exploitative class structure that had already come into existence.

Although the Purusha Sukta uses the term rajanya, not Kshatriya, it is considered the first instance in the extant Vedic texts where four social classes are mentioned for the first time together. Usage of the term Rajanya possibly indicates the 'kinsmen of the Rajan' (i.e., kinsmen of the ruler) had emerged as a distinct social group then, such that by the end of the Vedic period, the term rajanya was replaced by Kshatriya; where rajanya stresses kinship with the Rajan and Kshatriya denotes power over a specific domain. The term rajanya unlike the word Kshatriya essentially denoted the status within a lineage. Whereas Kshatra, means "ruling; one of the ruling order".
Jaiswal points out the term Brahman rarely occurs in the Rig-veda with the exception of the Purusha Sukta and may not have been used for the priestly class. Based on the authority of Pāṇini, Patanjali, Kātyāyana and the Mahabharata, Jayaswal believes that Rajanya was the name of political people and that the Rajanyas were, therefore, a democracy (with an elected ruler). Some examples were the Andhaka and Vrsni Rajanyas who followed the system of elected rulers. Ram Sharan Sharma details how the central chief was elected by various clan chiefs or lineage chiefs with increasing polarisation between the rajanya (aristocracy helping the ruler) and the vis (peasants) leading to a distinction between the chiefs as a separate class (raja, rajanya, kshatra, kshatriya) on one hand and vis (clan peasantry) on the other hand.

The term kshatriya comes from kshatra and implies temporal authority and power which was based less on being a successful leader in battle and more on the tangible power of laying claim to sovereignty over a territory, and symbolising ownership over clan lands. This later gave rise to the idea of kingship.

In the period of the Brahmanas (800 BCE to 700 BCE) there was ambiguity in the position of the varna. In the Panchavimsha Brahmana (13,4,7), the Rajanya are placed first, followed by Brahmana then Vaishya. In Shatapatha Brahmana 13.8.3.11, the Rajanya are placed second. In Shatapatha Brahmana 1.1.4.12 the order is—Brahmana, Vaishya, Rajanya, Shudra. The order of the brahmanical tradition—Brahmana, Kshatriya, Vaishya, Shudra—became fixed from the time of dharmasutras (450 BCE to 100 BCE). The kshatriya were often considered pre-eminent in Buddhist circles. Even among Hindu societies they were sometimes at rivalry with the Brahmins, but they generally acknowledged the superiority of the priestly class. The Kshatriyas also began to question the yajnas of the historical Vedic religion, which led to religious ideas developed in the Upanishads.

Mahajanapadas 
The gaṇa sangha form of government was a oligarchic republic during the period of the Mahajanapadas (c. 600–300 BCE), that was ruled by Kshatriya clans. However, these kshatriyas did not follow the Vedic religion, and were sometimes called degenerate Kshatriyas or Shudras by Brahmanical sources. The kshatriyas served as representatives in the assembly at the capital, debated various issues put before the assembly. Due to the lack of patronage of Vedic Brahmanism, the kshatriyas of the gana sanghas were often patrons of Buddhism and Jainism.

In the kingdoms of the Mahajanapadas, the king claimed kshatriya status through the Vedic religion. While kings claimed to be kshatriya, some kings came from non-kshatriya origins.

After the Mahajanapada period, most of the prominent royal dynasties in northern India were not kshatriyas. The Nanda Empire, whose rulers were stated to be shudras, destroyed many kshatriya lineages.

Post-Mauryan Kshatriyas 
After the collapse of the Maurya Empire, numerous clan-based polities in Punjab, Haryana, and Rajasthan claimed kshatriya status.

The Shakas and Yavanas were considered to be low-status kshatriyas by brahmin authors.

In the third to fourth centuries CE, kingdoms in the Krishna and Godavari rivers claimed kshatriya status and performed Vedic rituals to legitimate themselves as rulers.

Emergence of "Puranic" Kshatriyas 
In the era from 300 to 700 CE, new royal dynasties were bestowed kshatriya status by brahmins by linking them to the kshatriyas of the epics and Puranas. Dynasties began affiliating themselves with the Solar and Lunar dynasties and this gave them legitimation as rulers. In return the newly christened kshatriyas would patronize and reward the brahmins. The Sanskritic culture of the kshatriyas of this period was heavily influential for later periods and set the style that kshatriyas of later periods appealed to. This process took place both in North India and the Deccan.

Modern era 
Writing in the context of how the jajmani system operated in the 1960s, Pauline Kolenda noted that the "caste function of the Kshatriya is to lead and protect the village, and with conquest to manage their conquered lands. The Kshatriyas do perform these functions today to the extent possible, by distributing food as payments to kamins and providing leadership."

A number of castes in the modern era began claiming kshatriya origin, but that they purportedly fell in status due to economic necessity or ritual faults.

Symbols

In rituals, the nyagrodha (Ficus indica or India fig or banyan tree) danda, or staff, is assigned to the kshatriya class, along with a mantra, intended to impart physical vitality or 'ojas'.

Lineage

The Vedas do not mention kshatriya (or varna) of any vansha (lineage). The lineages of the Itihasa-Purana tradition are: the Solar dynasty (Suryavamsha); and the Lunar dynasty (Chandravamsha/ Somavamsha).

There are other lineages, such as Agnivanshi ("fire lineage"), in which an eponymous ancestor rises out of Agni (fire), and Nagavanshi (snake-born), claiming descent from the Nāgas. The Nagavanshi, were Naga tribes whose origin can be found in scriptures such as Mahabharata.

See also
Indian caste system
Forward castes
Sanskritisation

References

Further reading
Ramesh Chandra Majumdar, Bharatiya Vidya Bhavan. History and Culture of Indian People, The Vedic Age. Bharatiya Vidya Bhavan, 1996. pp. 313–314

 
Varnas in Hinduism
Indian castes
Warriors